"Sound of Free" (alternately known as "Settle Down") is a song performed by American musicians Dennis Wilson and Daryl Dragon (the latter credited as "Rumbo") that was written by Wilson and Mike Love. It was released by Stateside Records  as a British-exclusive single on December 4, 1970. The B-side was "Lady". In 2013, "Sound of Free" was officially released on CD for the first time on the Beach Boys' box set Made in California.

Writing in his 1978 biography of the band John Tobler said, "No-one seems to have ever asked Dennis what the idea was behind this burst of independence, but it's possible that there's some connection with the fact that Sunflower, and in fact Surf's Up ... were released in Britain on the Stateside label."

In 2021, a remaster of the song was included on the compilation Feel Flows. A stereo mix was not created because the multitrack tape had been lost.

Personnel
Credits from Craig Slowinski 

Dennis Wilson and Rumbo
Daryl Dragon - piano, Hammond organ, Moog synthesizers
Dennis Wilson - lead vocals, drums, tambourine, shaker, mark-tree

Additional musicians
Glenn Ferris - trombone
Sal Marquez - trumpet
Roger Neumann - tenor saxophone
Joe Osborn - bass guitar
Joel Peskin - baritone saxophone
Mike Price - trumpet
Brian Wilson - backing vocals
Carl Wilson - backing vocals, electric guitars

References

External links
 

1970 singles
Dennis Wilson songs
Songs written by Dennis Wilson
Song recordings produced by Dennis Wilson
Songs written by Mike Love